Valentin Ivanovich Tsvetkov (27 August 1948 – 18 October 2002) was a Russian politician who served as the governor of Magadan Oblast in the Russian Far East from 1996 to his assassination.

Biography 
Valentin Tsvetkov was born on 27 August 1948. In 1974 he graduated from the Zaporozhye Machine Construction Institute. From 1974 to 1980 he was a foreman, then senior foreman, then head of the department of the Magadan repair and mechanical plant. 1980-83 - Deputy Director of the Magadan Woodworking Plant. 1983-86 - deputy director, then director (1986-94) of the Magadannerud enterprise. In 1990, the KGB opened a criminal case on industrial smuggling against the Spark JV, whose director was Tsvetkov. On 17 April 1991, the case was dropped "for lack of corpus delicti."

On 12 December 1993 he was elected to the first Federation Council. On 17 December 1995, he was elected to the State Duma in Magadan constituency. In May 1997, Tsvetkov's mandate in the by-election was won by Vladimir Butkeyev.

On 3 November 1996, Tsvetkov was elected Governor of the Magadan Region. In January 1997, he became ex officio member of the second Federation Council.

Assassination 
On 18 October 2002 Tsvetkov was shot dead near the Magadan Oblast representative office on New Arbat Avenue in Moscow. The killer who was waiting at the building shot Tsvetkov in the head. The main version of the assassination is connected with the distribution of fishing quotas in the region and attempts by organized criminal groups (including ethnic ones) to weaken government control of Magadan Oblast gold mines. 

The suspects in the murder were Russian citizens Alexander Zakharov and Martin Babakekhyan. They were arrested on 7 July 2006 in the Spanish resort of Marbella. On 18 August 2007 Spain extradited Zakharov to Russia. Babakekhyan was extradited five months later. In 2011, the jury found that the guilt of Martin Babakekhyan, Artur Anisimov, Alexander Zakharov and Masis Akhunts in involvement in the murder was proven. The Moscow City Court sentenced them to imprisonment for a term of 13.5 to 19 years.

Awards 
 Order of Honour (29 July 1998) — "for a great personal contribution to the socio-economic development of the region and many years of conscientious work."
 Order "For Merit to the Fatherland" 4th class (7 May 2001) — "for a great contribution to the strengthening of Russian statehood and the implementation of economic reforms."

References 

1948 births
2002 deaths
Zaporizhzhya National Technical University alumni
Recipients of the Order "For Merit to the Fatherland", 4th class
Members of the Federation Council of Russia (1994–1996)
Members of the Federation Council of Russia (1996–2000)
Second convocation members of the State Duma (Russian Federation)
Governors of Magadan Oblast
Heads of the federal subjects of Russia who died in office
Assassinated Russian politicians